Wentscher is a surname. Notable people with the surname include:

 Max Wentscher (1862–1942), German philosopher
 Tina Haim-Wentscher (1887–1974), German-Australian sculptress, also known as Tina Wentcher